The 1945 Manitoba general election was held on October 15, 1945 to elect Members of the Legislative Assembly of the Province of Manitoba, Canada. The election was a landslide majority government for the incumbent coalition government led by the Liberal-Progressive Party.

The 1945 provincial election was extremely different from the previous election, which was held in 1941.  In the 1941 election, the province's four legal political parties were united in a coalition government—and while coalition partners ran against one another in some constituencies, the final outcome was never in doubt.

By 1945, the coalition had been reduced to three parties.  The dominant party was the Liberal-Progressive Party, whose leader was Premier Stuart Garson.  The Progressive Conservative Party of Errick Willis (formerly called the Conservative Party) was the junior partner in government, while the small Social Credit League and some independents also supported the coalition.

The social-democratic Co-operative Commonwealth Federation (CCF) left the coalition in 1943, and experienced a surge in popularity over the next two years.  This party was the primary opposition to the coalition government in 1945.  When Tommy Douglas's CCF won a landslide election victory in 1944 in neighbouring Saskatchewan, many believed that the Manitoba party had a chance of forming government.

The communist Labour Progressive Party also ran in the election, against the coalition. The Communist Party of Canada had been banned in 1941 so sitting MLA Bill Kardash and candidates of that ilk ran under the label "Labour Progressive Party" starting in 1943.

A revived Socialist Party of Canada also fielded one candidate in Winnipeg.

The CCF experienced numerous difficulties during the campaign.  Two of its incumbent members, Dwight Johnson and Beresford Richards, were accused of holding communist sympathies, and broke from the party to seek re-election as "Independent CCF" candidates.  Party members were divided on the positions held by Johnson and Richards, and the CCF entered the campaign in a divided state.  The party also suffered a series of unexpected technical problems: some candidates were unable to campaign because of late nomination filing, insufficient signatures on their nomination forms, and related reasons.

The result of the election was a landslide majority government for the coalition.  Twenty-five Liberal-Progressives and thirteen Progressive Conservatives were elected, along with two Social Crediters and three independent coalitionists.  This gave the coalition forty-three of fifty-seven seats.  Most of the coalition's members were from rural constituencies.

The Cooperative Commonwealth Federation won four of ten seats in Winnipeg, but could not duplicate this success in the rest of the province.  The party won only nine seats in total, up from three in the previous election.  Richards, who was re-elected as an Independent CCF candidate, later rejoined the caucus as a tenth member.  The CCF actually received more votes than any other party, but this meant little in practical terms: the combined coalition vote was well above the CCF total, and some coalition seats were won by acclamation.

Labour Progressive Party leader Bill Kardash also won a Winnipeg seat, as did independent leftist Lewis Stubbs.

Like previous elections, all the voters cast preferential votes. Ten MLAs were elected in city-wide Winnipeg district through Single transferable vote; all other MLAs were elected through Instant-runoff voting.

Results

Results by riding
Bold names indicate members returned by acclamation. Italicized names indicate Anti-Coalition candidates returned. Incumbents are marked with *.

Winnipeg
Ten MLAs elected through Single transferable vote.

Post-election changes

Beresford Richards (Ind CCF) was re-admitted to the CCF caucus in December 1945.

Special elections for members of the armed forces were held in January 1946, in light of the fact that many Manitoba citizens had served overseas in World War II and were unable to vote in the general election.  Gordon Churchill was elected to represent the Canadian Army, Alex J. Stringer was elected for the Royal Canadian Navy and Ronald Turner was elected for the Royal Canadian Air Force.  Stringer later became a Progressive Conservative, while Turner became a Liberal-Progressive.  Churchill sat as an Independent.

Minnedosa (res. Earl Rutledge, July 13, 1948), November 2, 1948:
Henry Rungay (LP) 3470
Frith (CCF) 1362

Fairford (res. Stuart Garson, November 13, 1948), December 23, 1948:
James Anderson (LP) elected
Michael Taczynski (CCF)

Beresford Richards and Wilbert Doneleyko were expelled from the CCF in July 1949, and sat as independent members.

Iberville (res. John McDowell, 1949)

Winnipeg (res. Gunnar Thorvaldson, 1949)

Gordon Churchill, Army Representative, resigns in 1949.

See also
 List of Manitoba political parties

References

1945 elections in Canada
1945
1945 in Manitoba
October 1945 events in Canada